Nikodim is a masculine given name which may refer to:

Saint Nikodim I (died 1325), Eastern Orthodox saint, 10th Metropolitan of Peć and Archbishop of the Serbs
Metropolitan Nikodim (Rotov) of Leningrad (1929–1978), Metropolitan of Leningrad and Minsk, and undercover KGB agent
Nikodim Milaš (1845–1915), Serbian Orthodox Church bishop